Oberyn Nymeros Martell, nicknamed the Red Viper, is a fictional character in the A Song of Ice and Fire series of epic fantasy novels by American author George R. R. Martin and its television adaptation, Game of Thrones, where he is portrayed by Chilean-American actor Pedro Pascal.

Introduced in 2000's A Storm of Swords, Oberyn is the younger brother of Doran Martell, from the desert kingdom of Dorne. Unlike his sickly and pensive brother, Oberyn is notorious for both his dangerous and unpredictable nature and his affinity for poisons, for which he earned his nickname. He is subsequently sporadically mentioned in A Feast for Crows and A Dance with Dragons. Since his brother is sickly, he travels to King's Landing in order to claim the Dornish seat on the small council, as well as to seek vengeance for his sister Elia Martell's death at the hands of Ser Gregor Clegane, whom he suspects acted directly on orders from Tywin Lannister.

Character description 
Oberyn Martell is the younger brother of Prince Doran Martell, the ruler of the southern principality of Dorne. He is a hotheaded, forceful, and lustful man with a quick wit and a barbed tongue. He is a formidable fighter whose "legend was fearsome" and is nicknamed the "Red Viper" due to his preference for red clothing, as well as the rumor of his use of poisoned weapons in duels. Tywin Lannister described Oberyn as "always been half-mad"; Oberyn's brother Doran has described him as "ever the viper", "deadly, dangerous, unpredictable", and "no man dared tread on him", and Oberyn himself admitted being a "bloodthirsty man". Oberyn was also responsible for the crippling of Willas Tyrell, the heir of House Tyrell of Highgarden, during a joust, though Willas never blamed Oberyn for the accident and the two remained friends.

When Oberyn was no more than sixteen years old, he was found in bed with the paramour of old Lord Edgar Yronwood, who challenged Oberyn in a duel. The fight was only limited to drawing first blood and finished after both men took cuts, but Oberyn soon recovered while Lord Yronwood died of a festered wound, and it was rumored that Oberyn used a poisoned blade. In order to make peace with House Yronwood, Doran sent his own son Quentyn Martell to Yronwood as a ward and had Oberyn sent away to Oldtown and then overseas to Lys in temporary exile. Afterward, Oberyn traveled the world, served in the famous sellsword company Second Sons before founding a company of his own, and briefly studied poisons and dark arts as a novice at the Citadel, managing to obtain six links of the maester's chain before quitting due to boredom. He is bisexual and has eight illegitimate daughters, collectively known as the "Sand Snakes". He was very close to his older sister Elia and consequently seeks revenge upon Ser Gregor Clegane for her death.

Storylines

Books 

Oberyn Martell is not a point of view character in the novels, and his actions are witnessed directly and interpreted through the eyes of Tyrion Lannister in the third book, and is later mentioned via the viewpoints of his niece Arianne Martell and the Norvosi captain of his brother Doran's royal guard Areo Hotah in the fourth and fifth books.

A Storm of Swords  
Oberyn leads a Dornish envoy to King's Landing to claim the seat on the small council on Prince Doran's behalf and obtain justice for his sister Elia Martell's murderer, as was agreed with then acting Hand of the King, Tyrion Lannister, who is now relegated to the master of coins.  When Tyrion is accused of murdering King Joffrey Baratheon, Oberyn volunteers to champion for Tyrion in the trial by combat, so he can fight and seek revenge from the rival champion, Ser Gregor Clegane, who is Elia's murderer.  Though Oberyn manages to gain the upper hand in the duel and impale Clegane to the ground with his spear, Clegane manages to surprise him by foot sweeping him to the ground and bear-hugging him, then gouging his eyes and finally killing him by repeatedly smashing his unarmored face (Oberyn is wearing a light visorless halfhelm) with a mailed fist.  However, it is later revealed that Oberyn has coated his spear in manticore venom to ensure that Clegane will die a slow and agonizing death.

A Feast for Crows and A Dance with Dragons 
When news of Oberyn's death reaches Dorne, the oldest three Sand Snakes Obara, Nymeria and Tyene unsuccessfully attempt to pressure Prince Doran into declaring war against the Iron Throne.  Doran's estranged daughter Arianne then conspires with her three cousins to  instate Princess Myrcella as queen and create a war of succession against King Tommen and House Lannister, but their plan is foiled by Doran and they are all arrested by Areo Hotah.  Doran later reveals to Arianne that Oberyn has actually been acting as Doran's enforcer all along to carry out his secret grand plan for House Lannister's downfall.  The three Sand Snakes are later also told about the plan, released after swearing allegiance to Doran's strategy, and assigned individual missions to infiltrate the Iron Throne as sleeper agents.

TV adaptation 

Oberyn Martell is played by Chilean-American actor Pedro Pascal in the fourth season of the HBO television adaption.

Oberyn arrives in King's Landing with his paramour, Ellaria Sand, to attend Joffrey's wedding in his brother's stead, and his meeting with Tyrion makes it clear that he has actually come to take revenge against the Lannisters for their role in the deaths of his sister, nephew and niece. At the wedding, Joffrey dies after being poisoned, and Tywin initially suspects Oberyn of having a hand in the murder since Oberyn has a past with poison chemistry, while Oberyn denies involvement and accuses Tywin of ordering Gregor Clegane to rape and murder Elia. The two reach a settlement when Tywin promises Oberyn a meeting with Clegane in exchange for Oberyn serving as one of the three judges at Tyrion's trial. At the trial, Oberyn implies that he is not convinced of Tyrion's guilt, and openly questions Cersei's testimony and asks Shae why Tyrion would tell her about all of his plans to murder Joffrey if he was the perpetrator.

When Tyrion demands a trial by combat and Gregor Clegane is chosen as Cersei's champion, Oberyn volunteers to fight for Tyrion, proclaiming that he will exact his vengeance, starting with Ser Gregor. Martell valiantly fights Clegane, his superior speed making up for Clegane's size, and manages to wound him in the shoulder and the leg, flooring him. Refusing to kill him immediately, Oberyn furiously demands that Clegane admit to raping and killing Elia and her children, and that the order came from Tywin himself. Distracted for a moment, Oberyn is floored by Clegane, who – in a manner self-admittedly paraphrasing the murder of Elia – knocks out his teeth, straddles him and slowly gouges out his eyes, admitting to the rape and murder of Elia before crushing his skull. Tyrion is subsequently sentenced to death, but Oberyn's objective of vengeance was not in vain, since his spear is revealed to have been laced with the deadly venom of the manticore, which later begins to kill Clegane. Qyburn is charged with reviving the dying knight and does, though Clegane is now reduced to a mute zombie of his former self. Years later, in a battle with his brother Sandor Clegane, Gregor Clegane attempts to use the same move that he used to kill Oberyn against his brother, however, The Hound stabs him in the head before he can finish and sacrifices himself to push The Mountain out the side of the crumbling building, with both of them falling to their deaths in the flames of a dragon.

Reception 
Pedro Pascal garnered positive reviews for his role as Martell in the television show. For his performance, Pascal was nominated for the NewNowNext Award for Best New Television Actor, and, as part of the ensemble cast, the Screen Actors Guild Award for Outstanding Performance by an Ensemble in a Drama Series.

Family tree of House Martell

References 

A Song of Ice and Fire characters
Fictional bisexual males
Fictional LGBT characters in literature
Fictional LGBT characters in television
Fictional mercenaries
Fictional polyamorous characters
Fictional princes
Fictional vigilantes
Literary characters introduced in 2000
Male characters in literature
Male characters in television
Television characters introduced in 2014